Ndonga, also called Oshindonga, is a Bantu dialect spoken in Namibia and parts of Angola. It is a standardized dialect of the Ovambo language, and is mutually intelligible with Kwanyama, the other Ovambo dialect with a standard written form. With 810,000 speakers, the language has the largest number of speakers in Namibia.  

Martti Rautanen translated the Bible into the Ndonga dialect. Beginning his work in 1885, he published the New Testament in 1903, but it took until 1920 to finish the Old Testament. His Bible translation became the basis of a standardized form of Ndonga.

Phonology

Vowels
Oshindonga uses a five-vowel system:

Consonants
Oshindonga contains the following consonant phonemes: 

Prenasalized sounds are listed below: 

 [m̥p] 
 [mb] 
 [ɱv] 
[n̥θ]
 [nð] 
 [n̥ʃ] 
 [n̥t] 
 [nd] 
 [nz] 
 [n̥ts] 
 [ŋk] 
 [ŋɡ] 

Oshindonga also contains many other consonant compounds, listed below: 

 [m̥pʰ]
 [n̥tʰ]
 [n̥kʰ]
 [m̥pʰw]
 [n̥tʰw]
 [n̥kʰw]
 [n̥dz]
 [n̥tsʰ]
[ndʒ]
 [xw]
 [tsʼ] (voiceless, ejective, alveolar affricate)
 [psʲ] (voiceless, palatalized, labio-alveolar affricate)

References

External links

Ndonga

Ovambo language